Rainbow Lake is the source of Rainbow Stream in Rainbow township in the North Maine Woods. Nahmakanta Lake overflows through Nahmakanta Stream and Pemadumcook Chain of Lakes to the Penobscot River. The Appalachian Trail follows Rainbow Stream and the south shore of the lake; but the old logging road to the dam has deteriorated with boggy areas no longer passable by four-wheel drive vehicles. The lake has a small catchment basin and is surrounded by large granite boulders. The low nutrient input in this setting produces unusually clear water. The lake has a native population of brook trout.

Sources

Lakes of Piscataquis County, Maine
North Maine Woods
Penobscot River
Lakes of Maine